Saint Roch Cemetery is the first municipal cemetery in the city of Grenoble, France. It was blessed by the bishop of Grenoble Claude Simon on 19 August 1810.

The city has another cemetery, that of Grand Sablon, in the adjacent city of La Tronche.

Among those buried here are political leaders, military personnel, scientists and artists. The most important tombs however are of manufacturers of gloves.
The sculptors Victor Sappey, Henri Ding, Eustache Bernard, Aimé Charles Irvoy and Urbain Basset are also buried here.

Many mayors of the city since the French Revolution are buried in this cemetery, from Joseph-Marie de Barral, mayor in 1790, to Albert Michallon, mayor from 1959 to 1965, as are the painters Jules Flandrin and Jean Achard and Camille Teisseire,  representative for Isère in the French Chamber of Deputies (1820–1824) and Chevalier de la Légion d'honneur.

The most prestigious monument in the cemetery is the Saint Roch Chapel, built during the Bourbon Restoration in 1826 to replace the old chapel of the same name, built in the 15th century near a hospital for lepers.

References

External links

 Saint-Roch ! Vous avez dit cimetière ? 
 Saint Roch Cemetery on a web site for French cemeteries 
 

Buildings and structures in Grenoble
S
S
Tourist attractions in Grenoble